Forrest Knox (born March 17, 1956) is a farmer / stockman who has lived in Wilson County, Kansas since 1990. Prior to losing a Republican primary to Bruce Givens in 2016, he served in the Kansas Senate from 2013 to 2017, representing the 14th district encompassing all or part of Butler, Chautauqua, Coffey, Cowley, Elk, Greenwood, Montgomery, Wilson, and Woodson Counties - which includes much of the Kansas Flint Hills.  Prior to that, he served eight years in the Kansas House of Representatives, District 13. Knox was born in Topeka, Kansas.

Knox has a bachelor's degree in mechanical engineering from Kansas State University and a Master's in mechanical engineering from the Israel Institute of Technology. He lives on their farm outside Chanute, Kansas with his wife Reneé.  They have 13 children, four of whom were adopted.

State Committee Membership
	House Financial Institutions (Chair)
	House Utilities
	House Energy and Utilities (Vice-Chair)
	House Environment
	Senate Judiciary
	Senate Utilities (Vice-Chair)
	House Agriculture
	House Agriculture and Natural Resources (Vice-Chair)
	Senate Agriculture
	Joint Committee on State Building Construction
	House Corrections and Juvenile Justice
	Senate Corrections and Juvenile Justice (Vice-Chair)
	Joint Committee on Corrections and Juvenile Justice Oversight
	Clean Power Plan Implementation Study Committee
	Special Committee on Judiciary
	Telecommunications Study Committee
	Special Committee on Foster Care Adequacy (Chair)
	Senate Select Committee on Kansas Public Employees Retirement System (KPERS)
	Joint Committee on State-Tribal Relations (Chair)
	Engineering Success for the Future of KS Taskforce
	House Federal and State Affairs
	Social Services Budget
	Joint Committee on Energy and Environmental Policy (Chair)
	Joint Committee on Kansas Security

National Committee Membership
	National Conference of State Legislatures (NCSL) - Environment Committee (Vice-Chair)
	NCSL - Health and Human Services (Vice-Chair)
	NCSL - Communications, Financial Services and Interstate Commerce
	NCSL - Three Branch Working Group on Children's Issues
	NTSB – Nuclear Working Group

Major Legislation
Knox was the sponsor/cosponsor of bills that permit teachers, public employees, and the law-abiding public in general to be armed with a concealed weapon in public, and in publicly owned Kansas buildings where adequate security does not exist, including community colleges, universities, courthouses, state and local government buildings and also, for government employees, while on the job, to provide for their own protection. In its wake, the primary insurer of the vast majority of publicly owned buildings in Kansas initially dropped coverage for those schools and other government buildings that neglected to request an exemption to the law.  Other insurers picked up the coverage, often at reduced rates.

Knox proposed, and helped pass, legislation aimed at reforms in the current foster care system. One bill, which passed the Senate but was not passed into law, would create the possibility for the Kansas Department for Children and Families to authorize a pilot program for CARE foster homes, where CARE parents would be given more training and ability to "parent" foster children and meet the unique needs of each individual child.

In 2015, in his involvement on the Clean Power Plan Implementation Study Committee, Knox agreed with Chief Deputy Kansas Attorney General Jeff Chanay's statement that the (federal Clean Power Plan) rule was "clearly unlawful" and meant to systematically dismantle the coal industry, with Chanay further stating that it violated the 10th Amendment, which reserves powers not granted to the federal government by the Constitution to the states. Knox's statements implied that the state should consider resisting federal authority with regard to complying with Environmental Protection Agency regulations. Knox said "this is only one issue. There are many issues where the feds are overstepping."

References

Republican Party Kansas state senators
Living people
People from Altoona, Kansas
1956 births
21st-century American politicians